Marc Daniels (January 27, 1912 – April 23, 1989), born Danny Marcus, was an American television director.  He directed on programs such as I Love Lucy, Gunsmoke, Star Trek, Mission: Impossible, Hogan's Heroes, and more.

Life and career

Daniels was a graduate of the University of Michigan. After serving in the U.S. Army during World War II and until 1946, Daniels was hired by CBS to direct its first dramatic anthology program, Ford Theater, mastering live television direction. He was hired to direct the first 38 episodes of I Love Lucy, an early filmed series. Daniels recommended Vivian Vance for the role of Ethel Mertz. Daniels, along with cinematographer Karl Freund, has been credited with introducing the three-camera technique of filming as opposed to the conventional one-camera. In a 1977 interview, Daniels noted that he left I Love Lucy to take another job that paid more. "Maybe it was a stupid thing to do," he said. "But then we didn't know we were creating history. We were just doing a show".

In addition to I Love Lucy, Daniels also directed episodes of Where's Raymond?, Gunsmoke, Mission: Impossible, Fame, Alice, Hogan's Heroes, and The Andros Targets. To science fiction fans, Daniels is perhaps best known for directing fifteen episodes of Star Trek (including the episode "Mirror, Mirror") and writing an episode of the animated series ("One of Our Planets is Missing"). Near the end of his career, Daniels worked with Lucille Ball again on her last series, Life with Lucy (1986).

He had an uncredited appearance (via a photograph) as Dr. Jackson Roykirk in the Star Trek episode "The Changeling", which he also directed.

During his career, Daniels was nominated for two Primetime and one Daytime Emmy award, two Directors Guild of America awards, and four Hugo Awards.  He won one Hugo, a joint award in 1967 with Gene Roddenberry for "Best Dramatic Presentation" for the Star Trek episode "The Menagerie".

Death
Daniels died of congestive heart failure on April 23, 1989, in Santa Monica, California, at the age of 77.

References

External links
 

 

1912 births
1989 deaths
American television directors
Artists from Pittsburgh
Hugo Award winners
University of Michigan alumni
United States Army personnel of World War II